John Heathcoat-Amory may refer to:
 Sir John Heathcoat-Amory, 1st Baronet, British businessman and politician
 Sir John Heathcoat-Amory, 3rd Baronet, English cricketer